The Sierra de la Alfaguara is a mountain range in the Cordillera Subbética, beside the Sierra de Huétor in southern Spain.
It lies within the Parque Natural de la Sierra de Huétor y la Alfaguara.

Location

The mountain range rises above the town of Alfacar.
Scenes from the movie Indiana Jones and the Last Crusade were filmed on the mountain.

The range contains the Arboretum La Alfaguara, formerly a tree nursery that supplied mainly coniferous plants for the reforestation of the entire Sierra de Huétor.

The Darro River rises in this range, a short tributary of the Genil River.

Environment
The original vegetation of the range was largely destroyed by over-exploitation for forestry and livestock raising, and by wildfires.
Most of the trees now are species of pine that were used in reforestation. There are also cedars and firs, mixed with native trees such as oak or gall.

Wildlife includes wild boar and abundant herds of goats, which can be seen at surprisingly close range.
The mountain is also home to other animal species such as badgers and weasels, as well as bobcat, marten and genet.

References

External links

Entorno: Parque natural Sierra de Huétor, Granada

Baetic System
Alfaguara
Geography of the Province of Granada